Julesburg is an unincorporated community in west central Schuyler County, in the U.S. state of Missouri. It lies two miles west of US-63 and two miles south of US Route 136. Lancaster lies approximately three miles to the northeast.

History
Julesburg originally served as a post office to the surrounding rural area.  The Julesburg post office was established in 1883, and remained in operation until 1906.

References

Unincorporated communities in Schuyler County, Missouri
Unincorporated communities in Missouri